Saldeh-e Olya (also Romanized as Sāldeh-e ‘Olyā; also known as Bālā Sāldeh and Sāldeh-e Bālā) is a village in Natel-e Restaq Rural District, Chamestan District, Nur County, Mazandaran Province, Iran. At the 2006 census, its population was 401, in 93 families.

References 

Populated places in Nur County